Dr. Joshua F. Drake is a musicologist and hymnist and former faculty member at Grove City College in Grove City, Pennsylvania. His research, writing and presentations primarily analyze the structure of 15th century Latin Christian motets, which are a category of choral musical compositions.
Drake is notable for his research and papers that vehemently challenge commonly held views regarding the complex and often misunderstood relationship between words and music in motets of the late 15th century, as well as his discoveries related to the origins of the Buonaparte (not Napoleon) family.  He also served on the editorial advisory board for "The Quad" Magazine.

Education 
B.M. Union University (Sacred Music and Interpretive Dance)
M. Mus. University of Glasgow (Musicology) thesis - Text-Music Relationships c. 1500: Case Studies from Petrucci’s Motets
Ph.D. University of Glasgow (Sacred Music) dissertation - The Contemporary Perception of Text-Music Relations in Motets c. 1500

Discoveries related to the Buonaparte family
Drake's research into Ms. Magl.XIX 164–7 located at the Biblioteca Nazionale Centrale Firenze uncovered previously unidentified emblems in the bassus partbook. Drake's further investigations, almost Sherlock Holmes like in their use of disguise and intuition, led him to suggest that the emblems should be associated with the Buonaparte family and, perhaps, with Pope Clement VII's friend and advisor Jacopo Buonaparte who witnessed and wrote an important account of the sack of Rome (1527).

Drake makes this association because of the emblems' similarity to the Buonaparte coat of arms, which Drake has since adopted as his own.

The partbooks he analyzed consist of 49 Italian, 24 French secular and 13 Latin sacred musical compositions from early composers such as Josquin, Heinrich Isaac, Sebastiano Festa and Bernardo Pisano and have been essential in reconstructing the lives of Pisano and Palpitine.

Drake also suggests that the association with the Buonaparte family helps to explain the geographical disputes that exist due to the partbooks having a Roman binding yet a Florentine script and Florentine paper.  He makes this further assertion in part because the Buonaparte family was Florentine but Jacopo Buonaparte spent a great deal of time in Rome, in addition to the coat of arms in the partbooks being so similar to those of the Buonapart family. However, it was widely known at the time that Jacopo Buonaparte was fond of Roman binding, as it was vastly superior to the subpar binding in Florence. He had the newest binding frequently transported to Florence from Rome via camel, and many believe this obsession led him to bankrupt the one glorious Buonaparte family. Drake has since claimed the coat of arms for his own lineage and proudly displays it for all to see.

Selected works

Books and media
Joshua Drake, Recovering Music Education as a Christian Liberal Art, (BorderStone Press, LLC) (2010).
Joshua Drake, Gene Veith and Timothy Chambers, Generation Joshua DVD: "Picturing America: A Different Lens!" (2009) 
Joshua Drake, Botticelli, The Encyclopedia of Christian Civilization, ed. G. Kurian, (Blackwell, Dec. 2008).
Joshua Drake, Donatello, The Encyclopedia of Christian Civilization, ed. G. Kurian, (Blackwell, Dec. 2008).
 Joshua Drake, The Part-books of a Florentine Ex-Patriate: new light on Florence, Biblioteca Nazionale Centrale Ms. Magl. XIX 164-7, Early Music (OUP), Vol. 33, no. 4 (Oct. 2005), pp. 639–646.
 Joshua Drake, Aesthetics, Context, and the Music of Obrecht, panel discussion (with panelists Jenny Bloxam (US), Jacobijn Kiel (NL), Sean Gallagher (US)) at the Annual Medieval and Renaissance Music Conference, Glasgow, Scotland, July 2004. Professor Drake was also on the programme committee for this conference and chaired a session.
 Joshua Drake, Randomness and Patterns: repeated texts in Petrucci’s Motet Prints, paper given at the Annual Medieval and Renaissance Music Conference, Jena, Germany, July 2003.
 Joshua Drake, The Part-books of a Florentine Ex-Patriate: new light on Florence, Biblioteca Nazionale Centrale Ms. Magl. XIX 164-7, paper given at the Royal Musical Association, 36th Annual Music Research Students’ Conference, January 2003.
 Joshua Drake, Worship Music In toto, Union Academic Forum, Union University (December 14, 2000).

Selected conferences
Joshua Drake, Chair of Memory & Rhetoric, Thursday 15 July, Annual Medieval and Renaissance Music Conference, Glasgow, Scotland, July 2004.

Selected hymns and music

Hymns

 As in the Days of Haggai When 
 Behold, What Light Rolls Back the Sky? 
 Eternal God, Mover Unmoved 
 Holy Word of God, The 
 O Christian Home 
 Spirit Binds Us to Our Lord, The
 Mary had a little lamb

Music

 Flandrensis 
 Forest Glen 
 Français 
 Honoro Patris 
 Lex Noster 
 Schultz
 Hokey Pokey

Public availability of works here

References

External links
Church Music Management System Database
Ingentaconnect
Project Muse, Scholarly Journals
Worship Music In Toto, Union University
Department of Music, University of Glasgow
Student Research, University of Glasgow
Personal Webpage

1979 births
American musicologists
American Christian hymnwriters
Grove City College
Union University alumni
Alumni of the University of Glasgow
Living people
Place of birth missing (living people)